Aipy or Aepy was a city in ancient Elis, Greece. It was one of the oldest towns in Elis, mentioned by Homer in the Catalogue of Ships in Iliad, as one of the territories ruled by Nestor. Homer uses the expression "ἐΰκτιτον Αίπυ" (ἐΰκτιτον means "well-built" and Αίπυ, the town's name, means "steep"). It is also quoted in the Homeric Hymn to Apollo. There are those who believe that the name corresponds to the toponym A-pu2 cited in tablets in Linear B.

Its location is a mystery, which has occupied minds since at least the time of Strabo, who commented it could be considered that Aipy should be identified with a city called Margana or with a natural bastion located near Makistos. It may the same as the later Epeium, a town of Triphylia, which was located on a mountain, between Macistus and Heraea. The site of Epeium is tentatively identified with a site near Tripiti. Others suggest that Aipy was the later Typaneae, and locate its site between the present villages Platiana and Makistos (both in the municipal unit of Skillounta), where a wall of the ancient acropolis survives into the present, together with a theatre and an agora (market), now entirely in ruins.

References

Cities in ancient Peloponnese
Populated places in ancient Elis
Former populated places in Greece
Locations in the Iliad